Paterson is a Scottish and Irish  surname meaning "Fathers' son" or "son of Patrick". In Connacht, and Ulster, the name is considered to be an Anglicised form of the Irish language surname Ó Casáin.  Paterson is rarely used as a given name.  There are other spellings, including Patterson.  Notable people with the surname include:

Adrian Paterson, South African scientist
Aileen Paterson, Scottish children's writer
Andrew Paterson (disambiguation), multiple people
Alasdair Paterson, Scottish poet
Alex Paterson (1959), English musician
Alexander Paterson, Australian politician
Sir Alexander Paterson, British prison reformer
Algy Paterson, Australian last speaker of the Martuthunira language
Andrew J. Paterson, Canadian artist
Archie Paterson, Scottish footballer
Banjo Paterson, Australian poet
Barbara Paterson, Canadian sculptor
Basil A. Paterson (1926–2014), New York politician
Bill Paterson (actor), Scottish actor
Callum Paterson (born 1994), Scottish footballer
Charles Paterson (1882–1973), Scottish cricketer
Chris Paterson, Scottish rugby player
Craig Paterson (born 1959), Scottish footballer
Colin Paterson, Scottish entrepreneur
Cory Paterson, Australian Rugby League player 
David Paterson, New York Governor
Don Paterson, Scottish poet
Fred Paterson, Australian politician
Gil Paterson, Scottish politician
Helen Mary Elizabeth Paterson, birth name of Helen Allingham (1848–1926), British painter
Iain Paterson, Scottish baritone
Isabel Paterson, Canadian libertarian writer
Jack Paterson (born 1974), Canadian director, devisor, dramaturg, translator, actor
James Paterson (disambiguation), multiple people
James Hamilton-Paterson, British novelist and poet
Jamie Paterson (disambiguation), several people
Jennifer Paterson (1928–1999), British television chef
Jodi Ann Paterson, American model and actress
John Paterson (disambiguation), multiple people
Katherine Paterson, American children's writer
Lee Paterson, rugby league footballer for Scotland, Keighley Cougars, York, Batley Bulldogs, Carpentras XIII, Widnes Vikings, and Featherstone Rovers
Lloyd H. Paterson (1925–1988), New York politician
Marr Paterson (born 1887), Scottish footballer
Markus Paterson, British-Filipino actor, singer, television host, and footballer
Martin Paterson, English born Northern Ireland footballer
Matthew C. Paterson (died 1846), New York County D.A.
Meg Paterson, fictional character from Monarch of the Glen
Mike Paterson, Professor of Computer Science at the University of Warwick
Neil Paterson (disambiguation), multiple people
Owen Paterson, British politician
Owen Paterson, Australian production designer on The Matrix Series
Rex Paterson, British agriculturalist
Robert Paterson (disambiguation), multiple people
Stan Paterson (1924–2013), British glaciologist
Tania Paterson (born 1972), retired competitive diver from New Zealand
Thomas Paterson (disambiguation), multiple people
Tim Paterson, American computer programmer, author of MS-DOS
Tom Paterson, Scottish comics artist
Viola Paterson, Scottish artist
William Paterson (disambiguation), multiple people

See also
Paterson (given name)
Patterson (surname)

Anglicised Irish-language surnames
Anglicised Scottish Gaelic-language surnames
Scottish surnames
English-language surnames
Patronymic surnames
Surnames from given names